Brigadier Sir Gerald Thomas Fisher, KBE, CSI, CIE (27 August 1887 – 6 September 1965) was a British Indian Army officer and Indian Political Service officer. He was the Military Governor of British Somaliland from 1943 to 1948.

References 

Indian Political Service officers
British Indian Army officers
Governors of British Somaliland
Knights Commander of the Order of the British Empire
Companions of the Order of the Star of India
Companions of the Order of the Indian Empire
1887 births
1965 deaths
People from Dehradun
Alumni of Lincoln College, Oxford